The 2017 Erste Bank Open 500 was a men's tennis tournament played on indoor hard courts. It was the 43rd edition of the event, and part of the ATP World Tour 500 Series of the 2017 ATP World Tour. It was held at the Wiener Stadthalle in Vienna, Austria, from 23 October until 29 October 2017. Unseeded Lucas Pouille won the singles title.

Points and prize money

Point distribution

Prize money

Singles main-draw entrants

Seeds

 Rankings are as of October 16, 2017

Other entrants
The following players received wildcards into the singles main draw:
  Ernests Gulbis
  Sebastian Ofner

The following player received entry as a special exempt:
  Ričardas Berankis

The following players received entry from the qualifying draw:
  Guillermo García López 
  Pierre-Hugues Herbert 
  Dennis Novak 
  Guido Pella

The following players entered as a lucky loser:
  Thomas Fabbiano

Withdrawals
  Tomáš Berdych →replaced by  Kyle Edmund
  Grigor Dimitrov →replaced by  Thomas Fabbiano
  Ivo Karlović →replaced by  Damir Džumhur
  Gaël Monfils →replaced by  Andrey Rublev
  Milos Raonic →replaced by  Philipp Kohlschreiber

Doubles main-draw entrants

Seeds

 Rankings are as of October 16, 2017

Other entrants
The following pairs received wildcards into the doubles main draw:
  Philipp Kohlschreiber /  Max Mirnyi 
  Philipp Oswald /  Alexander Peya

The following pair received entry from the qualifying draw:
  Pablo Carreño Busta /  David Marrero

Withdrawals
During the tournament
  Oliver Marach

Finals

Singles

  Lucas Pouille defeated  Jo-Wilfried Tsonga, 6–1, 6–4.

Doubles

  Rohan Bopanna /  Pablo Cuevas defeated  Marcelo Demoliner /  Sam Querrey, 7–6(9–7), 6–7(4–7), [11–9]

References

External links
 
 ATP tournament profile

Erste Bank Open
Vienna Open
Erste Bank Open
Erste Bank Open